The 2013 Rugby League World Cup Atlantic qualification is a rugby league tournament that was held in October 2011 to decide the qualification for the 2013 Rugby League World Cup. It consisted of a round-robin play-off involving three teams; South Africa, Jamaica and the United States at Campbell's Field, New Jersey in the United States.

Standings

United States vs South Africa

South Africa vs Jamaica

Jamaica vs United States

Coached by Matt Elliott, the Tomahawks were leading 6–4 at half time and then shut out the Rugby Reggae Boys for the rest of the game finishing with a total of seven tries to gain a place in their first World Cup tournament.

Squads

Jamaica
The Jamaica squad as of 22 September 2011 is as follows:

Coach:  Dean Thomas

South Africa
The South Africa squad as at 22 September 2011 is as follows:

Coach:  Steven van Zyl

United States

Coach:  Matthew Elliott

References 

2011 in rugby league